Roozbeh Shahalidoost (born May 21, 1986) is an Iranian footballer who currently played for Saipa in the Persian Gulf Pro League.

Club career
In 2009, Shahalidoost joined Pas Hamedan F.C. after spending the previous season at Saipa F.C.

 Assists

References

Iranian footballers
Persian Gulf Pro League players
Saipa F.C. players
Pas players
1986 births
Living people
Association football midfielders